Myles Mills (born June 8, 1993), better known by his stage name Skizzy Mars, is an American rapper, songwriter, and record producer from Harlem, New York.

Early life
Mills was born and raised in Harlem, New York to his father, a therapist, and his mother, who operated two daycare centers in Manhattan. He attended an all-boys school St. Bernard's School during his elementary years and later graduated from the Browning School. Mills attended Union College to originally pursue a sports journalism major, but he dropped out ten weeks after starting classes to begin his rapping career.

Discography

Studio albums

Extended plays

Mixtapes

Singles

As lead artist

As featured artist

Music videos

References

1993 births
Living people
American male rappers
East Coast hip hop musicians
St. Bernard's School alumni
Union College (New York) alumni
21st-century American rappers
21st-century American male musicians
Browning School alumni